This is a list of shopping malls in the United States and its territories that have at least 2,000,000 total square feet of retail space (gross leasable area). The list is based on the latest self-reported figures from the mall management websites, which are also depicted on each mall's individual wiki page.

See also
List of largest shopping malls in the world
List of largest enclosed shopping malls in Canada

References